Weight of the World is a 2002 album by the Canadian hard rock band Harem Scarem. They released it as Rubber in Canada.

Track listing

Band members
Harry Hess - lead vocals, guitar, producer
Pete Lesperance - lead guitar, backing vocals
Barry Donaghy - bass guitar, backing vocals
Creighton Doane - drums, backing vocals

Release history

References 

2002 albums
Harem Scarem albums
Frontiers Records albums